Marine Corps Air Station Eagle Mountain Lake (MCAS Eagle Mountain Lake) was a United States Marine Corps air station that was located  northwest of Fort Worth, Texas during World War II.  Commissioned on December 1, 1942, the air station was originally supposed to be the home of the Marine Corps glider program.  When the program was cancelled in 1943 the station became home to the newly created Marine Night Fighting Squadrons.  After the war the air station went into caretaker status in December 1946 and became an Outlying Landing Field of Naval Air Station Dallas. After the war, it was used by various branches of the military before being sold to a private owner in the 1970s.  Today, the airfield is a private airport run by the Kenneth Copeland Ministry as Kenneth Copeland Airport.

History

World War II
In 1942,  of former ranch land were purchased on the eastern shore of Eagle Mountain Lake so the Marine Corps could set up glider operations.  Construction of the base began on July 24, 1942.  Marine Glider Group 71 (MLG-71) and Marine Glider Squadron 711 (VML-711) under the command of Colonel Vernon M. Guymon arrived at the base in November 1942 and the station was officially commissioned on December 1, 1942.

In May 1943, the Marine Corps cancelled its glider program  and on June 30, 1943, the base was redesignated a Naval Air Station.  The Navy's Strategic Tasks Air Group 2 used the airfield to test newly developed remote control aircraft until 1944 when they were moved to Traverse City, Michigan.

On April 1, 1944, the air station reverted to Marine Corps control by the authorization of CNO Dispatch 31TWX1715.  The Air Station's next higher echelon command was Commander, Naval Air Bases, Clinton, Oklahoma.  On April 9, Marine Aircraft Group 33 (MAG-33) arrived from Bogue Field, North Carolina.  MAG-33 stayed until August 17, 1944, when they left for San Diego, California.  In August, Marine Aircraft Group 93 (MAG-93) arrived from Marine Corps Air Station Cherry Point and remained until November.  In December the field became the home of Marine Aircraft Group 53 which was the Marine Corps' first night fighter group.  From then on the base was used primarily for night fighter training.  Two common night fighters that operated from the field were the Grumman F6F Hellcat and F7F Tigercat.

February 28, 1945 saw the arrival of VMF(N)-544 to MCAS Eagle Mountain Lake and it was also during this time that the air station reached its maximum utilization with a total of 121 aircraft on board.

Post World War II use

On 28 February 1946 the air station went into caretaker status on the authority of Aviation Planning Directive 27-NN-46.  Subsequently, the field became an Outlying Landing Field of Naval Air Station Dallas.  By 1955 it was listed on maps as "Eagle Mountain Lake National Guard Base".  In 1959, the severely deteriorated buildings were used in a science fiction film entitled Beyond the Time Barrier, in which the protagonist, an Air Force test pilot, travels into the future on a supersonic airplane and returns to find that the air base from which he took off is in ruins.  By 1973, maps depicted Eagle Mountain Lake as an abandoned airfield.  In the early 1980s, the property was transferred to televangelist Kenneth Copeland, and a new hangar had been built on the site of the original World War II-era structure.

See also

 List of United States Marine Corps installations
 List of active United States Marine Corps aircraft squadrons
 United States Marine Corps Aviation

References

Eagle Mountain Lake
Eag
Airports in Texas
Military installations in Texas
Military installations closed in 1946
1942 establishments in Texas
1946 disestablishments in Texas